The Urba affair was an incident of political corruption in France pertaining to skimming receipts from public works for use for party campaigning during the 1970s and 1980s.  The Urba consultancy was established in 1971 by the Socialist Party to advise Socialist-led communes on infrastructure projects and public works, which the party advocated the modernisation of.

The affair became public in 1989 when two police officers, Antoine Gaudino and Alain Mayot, investigating the Marseille regional office of Urba discovered detailed minutes of the organisation's contracts and financial dealings between the party and elected officials.  Although the minutes proved a direct link between Urba and graft activity, an edict from the office of French President François Mitterrand, himself listed as a recipient, prevented further investigation.  The Mitterrand election campaign of 1988 was directed by Henri Nallet, who then became Justice Minister.  In 1990 Mitterrand declared an amnesty for those under investigation, thus ending the affair.

Antoine Gaudino later wrote about his findings in a book, L'Enquête Impossible.  Socialist Party treasurer Henri Emmanuelli was tried in 1997 for corruption offences, for which he received a two-year suspended sentence.  The company itself was subsequently liquidated.

Socialist Party (France)
Political scandals in France